The 1936 Missouri lieutenant gubernatorial election was held on November 3, 1936. Democratic incumbent Frank Gaines Harris defeated Republican nominee Manvel H. Davis with 59.80% of the vote.

Primary elections
Primary elections were held on August 4, 1936.

Republican primary

Candidates
Manvel H. Davis, former State Senator
John R. Davis
Henri Chouteau

Results

General election

Candidates
Major party candidates
Frank Gaines Harris, Democratic
Manvel H. Davis, Republican

Other candidates
George A. Kovaka, Socialist
Vanderbilt Belton, Communist
Karl Oberheu, Socialist Labor

Results

References

1936
Gubernatorial
Missouri